Shahin Dezh (also Romanized as Shāhīn Dezh; also known as Şā’īn Dezh, Shahindej, and Sahin Dazh; formerly, Sāīn Kale,  and Şā’īn Qal‘eh) is a city in the Central District of Shahin Dezh County, West Azerbaijan province, Iran, and serves as capital of the county. At the 2006 census, its population was 34,204 in 8,671 households. The following census in 2011 counted 38,396 people in 10,782 households. The latest census in 2016 showed a population of 43,131 people in 12,826 households. Most of the population of Shahin Dej is made up of Azerbaijani people who speak the Azerbaijani language, and Kurds are in the minority. They are the second major ethnic group in this city. The people of Shahin Dej follow the Shia and Sunni religions.

Shahin Dezh is located about 1,300 meters in elevation. The city is on the Zarrineh River, southeast of Lake Urmia.

History
The modern town of Shahin Dezh was formerly known as Ṣāʾīn Qal‘eh. The name Ṣāʾīn (also spelled Sāīn, Shahin, etcetera.) is derived from the Mongol sayin, which translates as "good".

The local Turkic Afshars were brought to the area from Shiraz at the beginning of the 19th century by Fath-Ali Shah Qajar (1797–1834), the second shah of Qajar Iran. Later, a segment of these Afshars had to migrate to Urmia in order to make way for the Chardawri (Chardowli) Lurs. The chief of the Chardowli's resided at Mahmuddjik and was the commander of  men. In 1830, Ṣāʾīn Qal‘eh was sacked by Kurds led by Sheikh Ubeydullah. Ṣāʾīn Qal‘eh, being the site of an Iranian military garrison in the past, safeguarded the entrance to the Azerbaijan Province through the Zarrineh valley.

The ancient Karaftu caves, first described by Robert Ker Porter (1777–1842), and the old site of Takht-e Soleyman were formerly located in the territory of the Afshars of Ṣāʾīn Qal‘eh. The lake of Chamli Göl, near the village of Badarli with its floating island were likewise well known at the time. Some of the Afshars of Ṣāʾīn Qal‘eh belonged to the Yarsanism sect.

The old site of Ṣāʾīn Qal‘eh is now occupied by the modern town of Shahin Dezh, which is also the chef-lieu of Shahin Dezh County. In , its population was 3,170 which by 1991 had increased to 25,050.

The fortress of Ṣāʾīn Qal‘eh must not be confused with the similarly named fortress on the Abhar river to the east of Soltaniyeh, which was mentioned by Hamdallah Mustawfi (1281 – after 1339/40).

References

External links
 Images from this city

Shahin Dezh County

Cities in West Azerbaijan Province

Populated places in West Azerbaijan Province

Populated places in Shahin Dezh County

Kurdish settlements in West Azerbaijan Province